The following is a partial list of the "A" codes for Medical Subject Headings (MeSH), as defined by the United States National Library of Medicine (NLM).

This list continues the information at List of MeSH codes (A11). Codes following these are found at List of MeSH codes (A13). For other MeSH codes, see List of MeSH codes.

The source for this content is the set of 2006 MeSH Trees from the NLM.

– fluids and secretions

– amniotic fluid

– bodily secretions
  – bile
  – cerumen
  – colostrum
  – gastric juice
  – gastric acid
  – intestinal secretions
  – milk
  – milk, human
  – mucus
  – cervix mucus
  – pancreatic juice
  – saliva
  – sebum
  – semen
  – smegma
  – sputum
  – sweat
  – tears
  – venoms
  – vernix caseosa

– body fluids
  – ascitic fluid
  – blood
  – fetal blood
  – plasma
  – serum
  – immune sera
  – antilymphocyte serum
  – body fluid compartments
  – body water
  – bronchoalveolar lavage fluid
  – extracellular fluid
  – aqueous humor
  – cerebrospinal fluid
  – extravascular lung water
  – follicular fluid
  – labyrinthine fluids
  – endolymph
  – perilymph
  – lymph
  – chyle
  – plasma
  – synovial fluid
  – intracellular fluid
  – nasal lavage fluid
  – urine

– dental deposits
  – dental calculus
  – dental plaque
  – smear layer

– exudates and transudates
  – cyst fluid
  – dentinal fluid
  – gingival crevicular fluid

– feces
  – meconium
  – melena

– gastrointestinal contents

– hyalin

The list continues at List of MeSH codes (A13).

A12